Hot Pepper (1933) is an American pre-Code comedy film starring Lupe Vélez, Edmund Lowe, and Victor McLaglen, directed by John G. Blystone and released by Fox Film Corporation. The film appeared before the enforcement of the Production Code.

This film is considered an installment in the series of films dating back to the silent film What Price Glory? (1926), starring Lowe and McLaglen in their characters of Sergeant Harry Quirt and Captain Jim Flagg with Dolores del Río as the female costar. The pair made a sequel to that film called The Cock-Eyed World (1929), costarring Lili Damita. Two other films followed before Hot Pepper.

Cast
Edmund Lowe as Harry Quirt
Lupe Vélez as Pepper
Victor McLaglen as Jim Flagg
El Brendel as Olsen
Lilian Bond as Hortense
Boothe Howard as Trigger Thomas
Gloria Roy as Lily
 Leo White as Waiter (uncredited)

References

External links
Hot Pepper at IMDB

Hot Pepper lobby poster at Moviegoods(Wayback archived version)
Hot Pepper American release poster

1933 films
American black-and-white films
Films directed by John G. Blystone
Fox Film films
1933 comedy films
American comedy films
1930s English-language films
1930s American films